John Delaney (born December 30, 1985) is an American college baseball coach who was named Quinnipiac's head coach prior to the start of the 2015 season.  A Quinnipiac alumnus, Delaney played minor league baseball in the Milwaukee Brewers system before starting his coaching career.

Playing career
Delaney attended Xaverian Brothers High School in Westwood, Massachusetts, where he won a state baseball championship in 2004.  Delaney played college baseball at Quinnipiac from 2005 to 2008. He was named an all-Northeast Conference player each year. In 2008, the Milwaukee Brewers selected him in the 25th round of the Major League Baseball Draft.  He spent 2008 and 2009 in Milwaukee's minor league system, advancing as high as Class-A Wisconsin.  He played independent league baseball in 2010 before retiring.

Coaching career
He began his coaching career as an assistant at Sacred Heart in 2011 under head coach Nick Giaquinto.  That year, the Pioneers won the NEC Tournament to advance to their second NCAA Tournament, where they went 0–2.  Delaney spent 2012 as an assistant at Hartford under first-year head coach Justin Blood.

Delaney joined Quinnipiac's staff as an assistant for the 2013 season.  In 2014, Quinnipiac promoted Delaney to associate head coach and named him the successor of head coach Dan Gooley, who announced that he would retire after the season.

In 2015, Delaney's first season as head coach, Quinnipiac made its second straight playoff appearance with a 15–9, third-place showing in the MAAC. It was the Bobcats' highest regular-season finish since sharing the NEC regular-season title in 2007. In the MAAC Tournament, Quinnipiac won its first two games against #6 Marist and #2 Canisius before bowing out after losses to Siena and Canisius. The team placed a league-high five players on the all-MAAC First Team.

Head coaching record

}}

}}

References

Living people
1985 births
Hartford Hawks baseball coaches
Helena Brewers players
People from Hanson, Massachusetts
Quinnipiac Bobcats baseball coaches
Quinnipiac Bobcats baseball players
Sacred Heart Pioneers baseball coaches
Sportspeople from Plymouth County, Massachusetts
Washington Wild Things players
Wisconsin Timber Rattlers players
Xaverian Brothers High School alumni